Kennedy Nagoli, also known as Nagoli Kennedy (born 24 May 1973 in Harare) is a former Zimbabwean footballer. He played as a midfielder.

Career
In career (1991–2006) has played for Jomo Cosmos, Santos FC, Aris Salonika, PAS Giannena, Enosis Neon Paralimni and AEK Larnaca. With Under-23 Zimbabwean national football team he played All-Africa Games in Egypt (1991), when Zimbabwe was 4th. He went to Santos F.C. (South Africa) after Pelé met Nelson Mandela in South Africa.

External links
Bio at AllaAdrica

Living people
1973 births
Sportspeople from Harare
Zimbabwean footballers
Jomo Cosmos F.C. players
Santos F.C. (South Africa) players
Aris Thessaloniki F.C. players
PAS Giannina F.C. players
Enosis Neon Paralimni FC players
AEK Larnaca FC players
Association football forwards
Zimbabwean expatriate footballers
Expatriate soccer players in South Africa
Zimbabwean expatriate sportspeople in South Africa
Expatriate footballers in Cyprus
Zimbabwean expatriate sportspeople in Cyprus
Expatriate footballers in Greece
Zimbabwean expatriate sportspeople in Greece
Cypriot First Division players
Super League Greece players
Zimbabwe international footballers